Kensington House may refer to the following places in London:

 Kensington House, an early name for Kensington Palace
 Kensington House, the home of Cecil Thomas (sculptor)
 Kensington House (academy), a residence for Sir Thomas Colby, academy, boarding house, and private asylum